The 1999 WNBA season was the third for the Los Angeles Sparks. The Sparks qualified for the playoffs for the first time in franchise history, but they fell in the Conference Finals to eventual champion Houston Comets.

Offseason

WNBA Draft

Regular season

Season standings

Season schedule

Playoffs

Player stats

References

External links
Sparks on Basketball Reference

Los Angeles Sparks seasons
Los Angeles
Los Angeles Sparks